The white-throated cacholote (Pseudoseisura gutturalis) is a species of bird in the family Furnariidae. It is found in Argentina (Patagonia and the northwest).

Its natural habitat is subtropical or tropical dry shrubland.

References

white-throated cacholote
Endemic birds of Argentina
Birds of Patagonia
white-throated cacholote
Taxonomy articles created by Polbot